Stop Podcasting Yourself is a Canadian comedy podcast distributed on the Maximum Fun network hosted by Graham Clark and Dave Shumka. Each week the comedy duo invites a guest (usually a fellow comedian) onto the program for a conversational interview. It is sometimes referred to by its acronym, SPY. The podcast is a three-time Canadian Comedy Award Winner for Best Podcast/Best Audio Show or Series, winning the award in 2012, 2013 and 2014.

History
Stop Podcasting Yourself started independently on March 2, 2008, being distributed through iTunes and its blog. At the time, podcasting had not "sorted itself out yet". Originally, Clark and Shumka intended to do sketches on the show. Due to its early start in the world of podcasting, the show is considered a pioneer for comedy podcast chat shows.

On March 22, 2010, it was announced that the Vancouver-based podcast would join Maximum Fun.

On April 15, 2016, the hosts went on to sprout the podcast and album Our Debut Album.

Format
The podcast's segments include "Get to Know Us" (where they get to know the guest) and "Overheard", where they discuss humorous things they've overheard (or sometimes overseen) in their day-to-day lives. The podcast is released every Monday and is the only Canadian show on the Maximum Fun network. Other than those two segments, the show has "little in the way of format". Despite this, the show has been described as having a consistent "tone, and speed ... whether the guest is a famous LA comedian, or a smaller local one". The show is also consistent in releasing episodes. As of 2016, the show had only missed two weeks since debuting.

The show is usually recorded at Shumka's home studio in Vancouver. Its listeners are referred to as "bumpers" after Shumka mistakenly referred to the audience that way in episode 1.

Notable guests

Steve Bays
Dan Beirne
Ian Boothby
Sophie Buddle
River Butcher
Brent Butt
Adam Buxton 
Colt Cabana
Adam Christie
Katie Crown
Ivan Decker
Charlie Demers
D.J. Demers
Debra DiGiovanni
Jon Dore
Sam Easton
Ennis Esmer
Mark Forward
Ron Funches
Mayce Galoni
Courtney Gilmour
Nikki Glaser
Amy Goodmurphy
Emmet Hall
Kim Senklip Harvey
Ali Hassan
Emily Heller
John Hodgman
Helen Hong
Becky Johnson
Myq Kaplan
Moshe Kasher
Graham Kay
Chris Kelly
Jamie Kilstein
Kyle Kinane
Rebecca Kohler
Mark Little
Kayla Lorette
Jeff McEnery
Mark McGuckin
Stacey McGunnigle
Dave Merheje
Darcy Michael
Mike Mitchell
Kliph Nesteroff
Peter Oldring
Jimmy Pardo
Eddie Pepitone
Aaron Read
April Richardson
Jacob Samuel
Tom Scharpling
Rory Scovel
Erica Sigurdson
DeAnne Smith
Ryan Steele
Beth Stelling
Scott Thompson
Jesse Thorn
Pat Thornton
Steph Tolev
Paul F. Tompkins
Taz VanRassel
Baron Vaughn
Kulap Vilaysack
Reggie Watts
Stuart Wellington
Dan Werb
Glenn Wool
Hawksley Workman

References

External links
Website at Maximum Fun
Stop Podcasting Yourself Blog

Maximum Fun
Comedy and humor podcasts
Audio podcasts
2008 podcast debuts
Canadian Comedy Award winners
Culture of Vancouver
Canadian podcasts